Michael Feeney was an Irish hurler. At club level he played for Ballyduff and was a substitute on the Waterford senior hurling team that won the 1948 All-Ireland Championship.

References

Ballyduff Upper hurlers
UCD hurlers
Waterford inter-county hurlers
Possibly living people